Albert Frank Nufer (1894-November 6, 1956, Manila, Philippines) was an American diplomat who served as Ambassador to Argentina and the Philippines.  He was Ambassador to El Salvador 1947–1949.,

Nufer served as Ambassador to Argentina from August 14, 1952, until May 12, 1956.  Nufer died of what was described as a coronary thrombosis at his residence in Manila while serving as Ambassador to the Philippines. He was 62.

References

Ambassadors of the United States to the Philippines
Ambassadors of the United States to Argentina
Ambassadors of the United States to El Salvador
1956 deaths
1894 births
20th-century American diplomats